William Brouncker may refer to:

 William Brouncker (died 1596), MP for Westbury and Wiltshire
 William Brouncker (died 1680), MP for Westbury
 William Brouncker, 2nd Viscount Brouncker (1620–1684), English mathematician